Theodore Roosevelt Cremer (March 16, 1919 – November 1980) is a former American football player who played in the National Football League.

Biography
Cremer was born March 16, 1919, in Corbin, Kentucky.

Career
Cremer played two seasons with the Detroit Lions before splitting the 1948 NFL season between the Lions and the Green Bay Packers. He played at the collegiate level at Auburn University.

See also
List of Detroit Lions players
List of Green Bay Packers players

References

1919 births
1980 deaths
People from Corbin, Kentucky
Detroit Lions players
Green Bay Packers players
Auburn Tigers football players